Mohammad Mehdi Khorrami is a literary critic, writer and Iranologist.

He studied Persian and French literatures in the University of Texas at Austin and he received his PhD in 1996. Currently he teaches Persian language and literature at New York University. His research is focused on the literary characteristics of contemporary Persian fiction and classical Persian poetry. He is also a specialist in Persian literature in migration.

Publications

See also
Iranology
Persian literature

References

American literary critics
Iranologists
University of Texas at Austin College of Liberal Arts alumni
Living people
Year of birth missing (living people)
American Iranologists
New York University faculty